The SAFF U-18/U-19/U-20 Women's Championship is a biennial  international association football tournament for women's national football teams under the age of 18/19/20, governed by the South Asian Football Federation (SAFF). All the seven teams of the member associations are eligible to compete in tournament, unless sanctioned by AFC or FIFA.

Results
U18 format

U19 format

U20 format

Participating nations

Legend

 – Champions
 – Runners-up
 – Third place
 – Fourth place
GS – Group stage
q – Qualified for upcoming tournament
 — Hosts
 ×  – Did not enter
 •  – Did not qualify
 ×  – Withdrew before qualification
 — Withdrew after qualification
 — Disqualified after qualification

Awards

Winning coaches

References

 
SAFF competitions
Youth football competitions
Under-18 association football
Recurring sporting events established in 2018
Women's association football competitions in Asia
2018 establishments in Asia